Davin Bush (born October 5, 1977) is a defensive halfback who most recently played for the Winnipeg Blue Bombers of the Canadian Football League in the 2007 CFL season. 

Bush was signed as a free agent by Winnipeg in 2007 after playing with the Saskatchewan Roughriders from 2001 to 2006. He was released by the Blue Bombers on January 30, 2008. He attended college at the University of Central Florida. His brother Devin Bush is a former safety in the National Football League.

References 

Winnipeg Blue Bombers players
Saskatchewan Roughriders players
Players of American football from Miami
1977 births
Living people
UCF Knights football players
Canadian football defensive backs
American players of Canadian football
Players of Canadian football from Miami